Logan Wright Jr. (6 December 1933 – 18 December 1999) was an American pediatric psychologist and former president of the American Psychological Association (APA). He coined the term pediatric psychology, co-founded the Society of Pediatric Psychology (SPP) and made numerous advances within the field. He was involved in the founding of the American Psychological Society (APS) in the mid-1980s when many psychological scientists split off from the APA.

Biography

Early life
Wright was born in Wellington, Kansas. He earned all-state track honors at Will Rogers High School in Tulsa, Oklahoma. He graduated from Oklahoma Baptist University, where he had received a track scholarship and served as track team captain as a senior. He completed a graduate degree in religious education from Golden Gate Seminary and began teaching at Bethel College in Kentucky. Wright returned to Vanderbilt University and earned a PhD in psychology in 1964.

Career
After an internship at the University of North Carolina, he joined the faculty at Purdue University and remained there until 1966. He left Purdue for the University of Oklahoma Health Sciences Center (OUHSC), where he served as associate professor and professor of pediatric psychology. Psychologist Diane Willis wrote that Wright "put pediatric psychology on the map" while at OUHSC. Wright worked with George Albee, president of the APA Section on Clinical Child Psychology, to evaluate the impact of having psychologists in the pediatric setting in 1967. He led an APA committee that identified 250 psychologists interested in pediatric work. This led to the formation of the SPP in 1968.

In addition to coining the term pediatric psychology, Wright wrote several conceptual papers related to the field. He was one of the first to demonstrate that psychological interventions could enhance pediatric medical care. Wright became known for psychological research that impacted tracheotomy dependence, encopresis and medication refusal. Wright co-wrote The Encyclopedia of Pediatric Psychology, a long-respected reference for practitioners in the specialty. He left his academic position in 1979 to build 66 Sonic Drive-In fast food franchises across the United States. Wright had open heart surgery in 1983, spurring an interest in health psychology, especially in the relationship between Type A personality and cardiac rehabilitation.

In 1984, Wright returned to academia as a psychology professor at the University of Oklahoma. Wright served as APA president in 1986. That year, three years after he had heart surgery, he also set a world age record for a 52-year-old in the 200-meter hurdles. Wright was involved in the controversial divide between the APA's scientists and practitioners in the mid-1980s. He helped psychology's scientists split off from the APA and form the APS. Past APA president and friend Ron Fox said that Wright had alienated some psychology practitioners, commenting, "We sent him to referee between practitioners and scientists and he joined the scientists."

Later life
In 1993, Wright founded the North American Association of Masters in Psychology, an organization that advocates for psychologists who are trained at the master's level. Wright was named professor emeritus at Oklahoma in 1995. He died of a heart attack on his ranch in Norman, Oklahoma in 1999. After his death, the SPP's Distinguished Research Contribution in Pediatric Psychology Award was renamed the Logan Wright Distinguished Research Award.

References

1933 births
1999 deaths
People from Wellington, Kansas
Oklahoma Baptist University alumni
Vanderbilt University alumni
Purdue University faculty
University of Oklahoma faculty
Presidents of the American Psychological Association
Businesspeople from Kansas
Businesspeople from Oklahoma
20th-century American businesspeople
20th-century psychologists